Acutitornus munda is a species of moth in the family Gelechiidae. It was described by Anthonie Johannes Theodorus Janse in 1951. It is found in South Africa and Namibia.

References

Apatetrinae
Moths described in 1951
Moths of Africa